Warn or WARN may refer to:

Enterprises and organizations 
 WARN (FM), a radio station (91.5 FM) licensed to Culpeper, Virginia, United States
 Warn Industries, US company manufacturing off-road vehicle accessories and recovery equipment
 Western Animal Rights Network,  or WARN, a coalition for animal rights groups in the West of England and South Wales
 Women of All Red Nations,  or WARN, a Native American women's organization founded in 1974

Legislation 
 Warning, Alert and Response Network Act, or WARN, a U.S. legislation
 Worker Adjustment and Retraining Notification Act,  or WARN, a U.S. legislation

See also 
 Warne (disambiguation)
 Warnes (disambiguation)
 Warning (disambiguation)